Malti Sharma was an Indian politician. She was a Member of Parliament, representing Uttar Pradesh in the Rajya Sabha the upper house of India's Parliament as a member of the Bharatiya Janata Party.

She was among the founding members of Jana Sangh and BJP. 

Whether it was Jana Sangh or BJP, she was counted among the top women party office bearers of the country. Because of her dedication, she got the spiritual affection from former PM Atal Bihari Vajpayee.

Early life 
She was born in Sonepat, Haryana. She earned an MA in political science in 1961 after bearing her youngest son Atul Sharma. 

Sharma married Brahmanand Sharma, a resident of Badina Kalan, a village in the Baschar area. He was a professor at DAV College and wrote more than 30 books.

Career 
She contested for the Jana Sangh and the BJP from 1967 to 1989. She became a founding member of Jana Sangh. In 1977, she became the first MLA in the government of CM Ramnaresh Yadav. She became Deputy Education Minister. Due to some differences, she later resigned from the Cabinet. She was the BJP district president four times. She served as BJP's state president of the women's front. Sharma was active In the BJP central executive for four and a half decades. She served as Vice President and National Vice President. 

The party honored her by making her a Rajya Sabha member in 1994. 

From the Charathawal seat, she got a ticket for Randhir Singh twice and the BJP won.

Developmental achievements 

 Sakavi Railway Over Bridge
 Central school in the city
 Making NH-58 a national route
 Reservation window start at railway station

Prison 
During the Emergency, she spent 19 months in Naini Central jail, in 1975.

Personal life 
She had three sons: Ashok, Arvind, and Atul and daughter Madhulika. Ashok and Madhulika are deceased.

She died in Muzaffarnagar. She was given a guard of honor. At her funeral, BJP and RSS leaders were present along with the leaders of the opposition parties.

Uttarakhand Chief Minister Trivendra Singh Rawat visited Malati Sharma's house to pay homage and Minister of Information and Broadcasting Smt. Smriti Irani.

References

1930 births
Living people
Rajya Sabha members from Uttar Pradesh
Bharatiya Janata Party politicians from Uttar Pradesh
Women in Uttar Pradesh politics
Women members of the Rajya Sabha